Elspeth Douglas McClelland (1879–1920) was an English suffragette and architect. She is known for being a "human letter" sent by the suffragettes to the Prime Minister.

Life 
Elspeth Douglas McClelland was born on 20 May 1879 in Keighley, Yorkshire to John McClelland, an accountant, and Epsey McClelland (née Robinson). She was baptised in Ilkley on 19 July the same year. She trained as an architect, the only female student among 600 men at the Polytechnic Architectural School in London, and has been described as the first woman to practice as an architect, although this is unlikely to be quite accurate. 

Architectural drawings show that she was working as an architect by 1904. She became a suffragette in the 1900s, married William Albert Spencer in 1912 and moved to Whitchurch Lane, Edgware. Elspeth had three children before dying in childbirth in 1920. According to her family, she was given a silver tea service by the queen in recognition of her contribution to women's causes. This was reportedly sold by her widower after her death.

Suffragette 

McClelland's time as a suffragette is best known for when she was sent as a "human letter" to the Prime Minister, H. H. Asquith, on 23 February 1909. At this time Post Office regulations had been relaxed to allow individuals to be "posted" by express messenger, so McClelland and fellow suffragette Daisy Solomon were dispatched by Jessie Kenney and "Christabel Pankhurst from Clement's Inn and were taken by Mrs. Drummond to the East Strand Post Office". Daisy Dorothea Solomon was from South Africa and she was the daughter of another suffragette Georgiana Solomon.

They were addressed to "The Right Hon H. H. Asquith, 10 Downing Street, SW". For the price of a threepenny stamp, A.S. Palmer, a telegraph messenger boy, delivered them to Downing Street, where the policemen on duty allowed them through to number 10. At that point, an official came out and "notwithstanding the ladies' protest that they had been 'paid for', said 'you cannot be delivered here. You must be returned; you are dead letters'". Elspeth and Daisy were returned to the offices of the Women's Social and Political Union. The Prime Minister was said to have been "amused" by the incident. The front-page photo from the Daily Mirror can be seen on The British Postal Museum & Archive Website.

In September 1913 Mrs Elspeth Spencer placed a classified ad in the suffragette newspaper Votes for Women (p. 732) describing herself:  'Architect of uncommon houses and cottages. Furniture and decorations in suffrage colours designed and executed. Apply Studio A, 22 Blomfield Road, Kensington.'

Architect 

There are conflicting reports about Elspeth's time as an architect. According to Atkinson, "McClelland had been the only woman among 600 male students at the Polytechnic Architectural School in London, and became the first woman to practice as an architect". However, records at the Royal Institute of British Architects (RIBA) indicate that its first female member was Ethel Mary Charles in 1898, when Elspeth would have been 19. The Polytechnic Architectural School has been absorbed into the University of Westminster. They do not have complete records for the likely dates of Elspeth's study. What they do show is Elspeth passing a Senior Commercial Education Certificate in book-keeping in the London Chamber of Commerce Examinations, 1911.
Some facts about her career are clear from surviving architectural drawings and other records.

Most of her drawings are undated, although one shows a date (1904) above the door. Several of her properties are in Letchworth, the one at 106 Wilbury Road having been designed as part of a competition to design a £150 cottage. According to Victoria Rawlings, Curator – Collections at the First Garden City Heritage Museum, "In 1905 strict planning regulations meant that in rural areas, the cost of building a cottage would be more than the tenant could afford to pay in rent.  This and other factors were adding to 'urban drift', whereby many agricultural workers were forced to move to the towns.  A Mr J St Loe Strachey, editor of The Spectator newspaper, put forth a proposal that an exhibition of £150 cottages should be held.  This challenge was taken up by First Garden City Ltd as, at the new town of Letchworth, rural bye-laws would not be applicable.

"Amongst the 85, otherwise male entrants to the competition, was Miss Elspeth McClelland, who designed and supervised the building of a cottage for the Society of Artists.  This group was, in Miss McClelland's own words: 'A Society of Women Decorators who have sometimes felt that architects do not study the requirements from a woman's point of view'.  Many newspapers ran articles extolling the virtues of what one paper called, 'The house that Jill built'.  
"Elspeth Cottage, as it was named, was built in concrete with a timber surround giving the look of an old English style but with modern materials.  Miss McClelland also designed much of the interior furniture herself in a traditional cottage style.  However, she was keen to point out the cottage was not merely an aesthetic venture, stating that: 'Much of the working women's time is spent in the scullery and I am therefore making it a bright and cheerful room with two windows instead of a dismal back kitchen'.  The coals and the toilet in this period were usually accessed through an outside door but Miss McClelland placed them with access from the inside and a covered porch, again making life easier for the housewife."
 
Elspeth gave talks on this design, for example, that reported by the Standard on 22 June 1905: "'A Cottage for £150' was the alluring title of an interesting lecture which Miss Elspeth McClelland gave yesterday at the Women's Institute, Victoria Street, W. Many people in better circumstances than working men might covet the charming little country cottages, the construction of which Miss McClelland explained in detail, and remarked that such sound, well-constructed little houses were admirable investments." In the same month, The Estates Gazette reported that "A member of the fair sex has come forward as a practical advocate of cheap houses for the working classes in country districts. On Wednesday last, at the Institute, Miss E. McClelland delivered an interesting lecture, entitled ‘A Cottage for £150,’ in the course of which she demonstrated to the satisfaction of an attentive audience that her designs combined comfort, economy and artistic consideration."
Elspeth not only designed houses, but also the fabrics and furniture to suit them. The Daily Express described her as "a young lady of many talents. After building a house for her clients, she will design wall papers, carpets, mantelpiece, and even furniture, to suit the rooms.", while The Lady's Pictorial wrote that "to Miss McClelland we owe the opening of another field for women’s work". If not supporting the claim that she was the first woman to practice as an architect, this indicates that there were few others.

References 

1879 births
1920 deaths
20th-century English architects
English suffragists
British women architects